Antiochus of Athens was an influential Hellenistic astrologer who flourished sometime between the late 1st and mid 2nd century AD.  There is some disagreement as to when he lived and wrote. Franz Cumont and others have argued that he lived as early as the 1st century BC, while David Pingree placed him as late as the end of the 2nd century AD.  The one agreed datum is that Antiochus is referenced by Porphyry (234-c. 305 AD), and so Antiochus must have lived before the death of Porphyry.

All the writings of Antiochus are now lost, but substantial fragments and extracts remain.  The works ascribed to him are a Thesaurus (Treasuries), an Introduction (Eisagogika) to astrology, and also an astrological calendar, On the risings and settings of the stars in the 12 months of the year.  Antiochus is extensively quoted or paraphrased by later writers, particularly the Neoplatonist Porphyry, and Rhetorius of Egypt.  There is also a later Byzantine epitome, or summary, of his work.  A parapegma or calendar of star risings and settings and weather changes is also extant.

Antiochus was influential upon later astrologers. Parts of his text were used as the basis for Porphyry's third-century Introduction to the Tetrabiblos of Ptolemy, as well as being quoted by Hephaistio of Thebes (380 AD), Anonymous of 379 AD (Treatise on Fixed Stars) and Julius Firmicus Maternus (c. 336 AD).

Porphyry relies heavily on Antiochus for definitions of technical terms used by Ptolemy in Tetrabiblos.  Antiochus made one of the earliest references to astrological reception, and discussed the twelves houses (topoi) of the astrological chart, heliacal risings and settings, and the Lots.

References

Further reading
Antiochus of Athens, The Thesaurus, Project Hindsight Greek Track, translated by Robert Schmidt, edited by Robert Hand, 1993.
Antiochus of Athens, Das Kalendarium des Antiochus, 1911.
Antiochus of Athens, Translation of the calendar and other discussion.

External links
Marilynn Lawrence (West Chester U. of Penn.) in The Internet Encyclopedia of Philosophy:  Hellenistic Astrology—section on Porphyry.
Bill Johnston, Article on Oktotopos for Association for Young Astrologers, retrieved January 6, 2006.
Robert Schmidt, Catalogue of Hellenistic astrologers and their writings at Project Hindsight—on Antiochus and Porphyry.
Deborah Houlding, A brief comparison of the use of reception in history at Skyscript, retrieved December 25, 2010.

Ancient Greek astrologers
Roman-era Athenians